The Thermotogota are a phylum of the domain Bacteria. The phylum Thermotogota is composed of Gram-negative staining, anaerobic, and mostly thermophilic and hyperthermophilic bacteria.

Characteristics
The name of this phylum is derived from the existence of many of these organisms at high temperatures along with the characteristic sheath structure, or "toga", surrounding the cells of these species. Recently, some Thermotogota existing at moderate temperatures have also been identified. Although Thermotogota species exhibit Gram-negative staining, they are bounded by a single-unit lipid membrane, hence they are monoderm bacteria. Because of the ability of some Thermotogota species to thrive at high temperatures, they are considered attractive targets for use in industrial processes. The metabolic ability of Thermotogota to utilize different complex-carbohydrates for production of hydrogen gas led to these species being cited as a possible biotechnological source for production of energy alternative to fossil fuels.

Molecular signatures
Until recently, no biochemical or molecular markers were known that could distinguish the species from the phylum Thermotogota from all other bacteria. However, a recent comparative genomic study has identified large numbers of conserved signature indels (CSIs) in important proteins that are specific for either all Thermotogota species or a number of its subgroups. Many of these CSIs in important housekeeping proteins such as Pol1, RecA, and TrpRS, and ribosomal proteins L4, L7/L12, S8, S9, etc. are uniquely present in different sequenced Thermotogota species providing novel molecular markers for this phylum. These studies also identified CSIs specific for each order and each family. These indels are the premise for the current taxonomic organization of the Thermotogota, and are strongly supported by phylogenomic analyses. Additional CSIs have also been found that are specific for Thermotoga, Pseudothermotoga, Fervidobacterium, and Thermosipho. These CSIs are specific for all species within each respective genus, and absent in all other bacteria, thus are specific markers. A clade consisting of the deep-branching species Petrotoga mobilis, Kosmotoga olearia, and Thermotogales bacterium mesG1 was also supported by seven CSIs. Additionally, some CSIs that provided evidence of LGT among the Thermotogota and other prokaryotic groups were also reported. The newly discovered molecular markers provide novel means for identification and circumscription of species from the phylum in molecular terms and for future revisions to its taxonomy.

Additionally, a 51 aa insertion CSI was identified to be specific for all Thermotogales as well as Aquificales, another order comprising hyperthermophilic species. Phylogenetic studies demonstrated that the presence of the same CSI within these two unrelated groups of bacteria is not due to lateral gene transfer, rather the CSI likely developed independently in these two groups of thermophiles due to selective pressure. The insert is located on the surface of the protein in the ATPase domain, near the binding site of ADP/ATP. Molecular dynamic stimulations revealed a network of hydrogen bonds formed between water molecules, residues within the CSI and a ADP/ATP molecule. It is thought that this network helps to maintain ADP/ATP binding to the SecA protein at high temperatures, contributing to the overall thermostable phenotype some Thermotogales species.

Phylogeny

Taxonomy
This phylum presently consists of a single class (Thermotogae), four orders (Thermotogales, Kosmotogales, Petrotogales, and Mesoaciditogales) and five families (Thermatogaceae, Fervidobacteriaceae, Kosmotogaceae, Petrotogaceae, and Mesoaciditogaceae). It contains a total of 15 genera and 52 species. In the 16S rRNA trees, the Thermotogota have been observed to branch with the Aquificota (another phylum comprising hyperthermophilic organisms) in close proximity to the archaeal-bacterial branch point. However, a close relationship of the Thermotogota to the Aquificota, and the deep branching of the latter group of species, is not supported by phylogenetic studies based upon other gene/protein sequences. and also by conserved signature indels in several highly conserved universal proteins. The Thermotogota have also been scrutinized for their supposedly profuse Lateral gene transfer with Archaeal organisms. However, recent studies based upon more robust methodologies suggest that incidence of LGT between Thermotogota and other groups including Archaea is not as high as suggested in earlier studies.

The currently accepted taxonomy is based on the List of Prokaryotic names with Standing in Nomenclature (LPSN) and National Center for Biotechnology Information (NCBI)

 Class Thermotogae Reysenbach 2002
 Genus Caldotoga Xue et al. 1999
 Order Thermotogales Reysenbach 2002
 Family Fervidobacteriaceae Bhandari & Gupta 2014
 Genus Fervidobacterium Patel et al. 1985
 Genus Thermosipho Huber et al. 1989 non Kantor et al. 2013
 Family Thermotogaceae Reysenbach 2002
 Genus Pseudothermotoga Bhandari & Gupta 2014
 Genus Thermopallium Duckworth et al. 1996
 Genus Thermotoga Stetter and Huber 1986
 Order Kosmotogales Bhandari & Gupta 2014
 Family Kosmotogaceae Bhandari & Gupta 2014
 Genus Kosmotoga DiPippo et al. 2009 [Thermococcoides Feng et al. 2010]
 Genus Mesotoga Nesbo et al. 2013
 Order Mesoaciditogales Itoh et al. 2015
 Family Mesoaciditogaceae Itoh et al. 2015
 Genus Athalassotoga Itoh et al. 2015
 Genus Mesoaciditoga Reysenbach et al. 2013
 Order Petrotogales Bhandari & Gupta 2014
 Family Petrotogaceae Bhandari & Gupta 2014
 Tribe "Marinitogeae" Pelletier 2012
 Genus Marinitoga Wery et al. 2001
 Tribe "Petrotogeae" Pelletier 2012
 Genus Defluviitoga Ben Hania et al. 2012
 Genus Geotoga Davey et al. 1993
 Genus Oceanotoga Jayasinghearachchi and Lal 2011
 Genus Petrotoga Davey et al. 1993
 Genus Tepiditoga Mori et al. 2021

References

 
Bergey's volume 1
Thermophiles
Thermozoa
Bacteria phyla